"I Don't Know Why" (sometimes listed as "Don't Know Why I Love You") is a song by American singer-songwriter Stevie Wonder, from the 1968 album For Once in My Life. It was released as a single on January 28, 1969, with "My Cherie Amour" on the B-side. A few months later, the single was re-issued with sides reversed because of the growing popularity of "My Cherie Amour", which became a Top Ten hit.

Cash Box stated that "Wonder is softened just a trifle on this slower and more dramatically developing ballad."

Personnel
Stevie Wonder – vocals, clavinet
The Funk Brothers – all other instruments

Charts
The single peaked at No. 39 on the US Billboard Hot 100. The song was recorded when Wonder was 18 years old, and became a moderate hit single, together with "You Met Your Match", another song from the album. It also showcases Wonder's talents on the clavinet.

Rolling Stones version

A rendition of "I Don't Know Why" by the Rolling Stones is included on their 1975 rarities compilation Metamorphosis. It was recorded on July 3, 1969, during the sessions for Let It Bleed. It was also the night that news broke of former guitarist Brian Jones' death, less than a month after he had been fired from the band. 

The song was also used as the B-side for their 1975 single "Try A Little Harder", and peaked at No. 42 on the US Billboard Hot 100.

References

1968 songs
1969 singles
Stevie Wonder songs
Songs written by Lula Mae Hardaway
Songs written by Stevie Wonder
Torch songs
Song recordings produced by Stevie Wonder